Rev. James Mascall Morrison Crombie (1831 – 12 May 1906) was a Scottish lichenologist.

Biography
Crombie was born in Aberdeen sometime in 1831, and attended Marischal College. He went on to earn his M.A. from Edinburgh University. His first publication was a small volume on the natural history Braemar in 1861. In 1862, Crombie became an ordained minister in the Church of Scotland. He was named Fellow of the Linnean Society in 1869. He began to publish his accounts of British lichens in 1870.

In 1879, Crombie was hired as a lecturer on botany at St Mary's Hospital Medical School, where he continued his studies on lichens. He determined specimens brought to him by travelers, and he delved into the herbaria of Johann Jacob Dillenius and William Withering. Many of his determinations were housed in the herbarium at Kew. Crombie, along with his friend William Nylander, rejected the symbiotic theory of lichens, which he passionate wrote about.

In 1891, Crombie left St Mary's and moved to London. He held various positions, including clerk to the synod in England. He retired in 1903, and died at Ewhurst, Surrey, on 12 May 1906.

Crombie was posthumously included in the 1911 Encyclopædia Britannica. Articles attributed to this author are designated by the initials "J. M. C."

Selected publications
Between 1861 and 1901, Crombie had over 50 published contributions on British lichens, including accounts on those of Epping Forest, Middlesex, and Norfolk.
 

 (in part)

Notes
1.Crombie claims he was born in 1833, but his widow stated he was born on 20 April 1830. Baptism records point to some time in 1831.

External links

See also
 :Category:Taxa named by James Mascall Morrison Crombie

References

1831 births
1906 deaths
Scottish botanists
British lichenologists
Fellows of the Linnean Society of London
Alumni of the University of Edinburgh